Florence R. Sabin is a bronze sculpture depicting the American medical scientist of the same name by Joy Buba, installed in the Hall of Columns, in Washington, D.C., as part of the National Statuary Hall Collection. The statue was gifted by the U.S. state of Colorado in 1959.

See also
 1959 in art

References

External links
 

1959 establishments in Washington, D.C.
1959 sculptures
Bronze sculptures in Washington, D.C.
Monuments and memorials in Washington, D.C.
Monuments and memorials to women
Sabin, Florence
Sculptures of women in Washington, D.C.